George Rikard Bell (born 1911, disappeared October 1936), better known by the stage name Brian Abbot, was an Australian actor best known for playing the male lead in Orphan of the Wilderness (1936) and the circumstances of his death.

Biography
George Rikard Bell (known professionally as Brian Abbot) ran away from school at aged 15 and worked as a jackeroo. He had a great love of sailing and originally wanted to be a sailor for a career, but worked on two vessels which later sunk, TSS Kanowna and SS Christina Frazer. In the words of a later newspaper profile, "As Mr. Abbot didn't believe in for the third time to prove that fate was against him he promptly decided that there were other adventurous jobs to be had which didn't carry the risk of drowning." He subsequently turned to acting, taking the stage name of Brian Abbot.

In early 1930 in Katoomba, he married Phyllis Curley and in September they welcomed their son, Hal Beaumont Rikard Bell into the world, named after his father, Harry (Hal). The October 1929 Wall Street crash reverberated around the world and Australia's unemployed rose from 10 percent in 1929 to 21 percent by the mid-1930s and by 1932 more than 31 percent of the Australian work force was unemployed. Brian (still known as George Rikard Bell) pursued a variety of jobs to support his struggling young family but it was difficult to find work.

Sometime later, in 1935, divorced from his first wife and known as Brian Abbot, he found his way into show business, getting a small role in Thoroughbred (1936) which led to him being cast by Ken G. Hall to play the lead in Orphan of the Wilderness (1936), although Hall later felt the actor's inexperience was evident in the final film.

By 1936, he had a new wife, Grace, and they were captured in a photo by Samuel Hood taken at Walsh Bay published on page 2 of The Australian Women's Weekly on 24 October 1936 (that later became famous in Australia in 2014) just before he set sail on the SS Morinda to Lord Howe Island to star in the film Mystery Island.

His grandson Philip Powers has also worked extensively in the Australian film industry, producing forty Australian feature film soundtrack albums as well as working for the Sydney Symphony Orchestra.

Disappearance
In October 1936, after completing work on Mystery Island (1937) on Lord Howe Island, Abbot and Leslie Hay-Simpson, a fellow actor, set out for Sydney in a 16-foot open longboat called The Mystery Star. They were never seen again, despite a search of over a week involving a number of vessels, including the naval destroyer .

Abbot's wife, Grace Rikard Bell, later sued the Producers and Citizens' Co-operative Assurance Co., Ltd. over her husband's death, claiming the company promised to insure his life for £1,000. The company (who were represented in court by Clive Evatt) alleged Abbot sailed back from Lord Howe Island in a small boat "quite unsuitable" for the journey without informing the company. The case was subsequently settled.

Lord Howe Island Crossing 
A significant number of boats have gone missing in the stretch of water between Sydney and Lord Howe Island over the years. A few weeks after Abbot's disappearance, a boat containing five men sailing from Sydney to the island also vanished.

See also 
List of people who disappeared mysteriously at sea

Filmography
Mystery Island (1937)
Orphan of the Wilderness (1936)
 Thoroughbred (1936)

References

External links
 
Brian Abbot at National Film and Sound Archive

1911 births
1930s missing person cases
1936 deaths
20th-century Australian male actors
Australian male film actors
Missing person cases in Australia
People lost at sea